Walter Vaughan (died 1598), of Golden Grove, Carmarthenshire, was a Member of Parliament for Carmarthenshire in 1572 and 1593, and Mayor of Carmarthen 1574, 1580 and 1597.

References

16th-century births
1598 deaths
16th-century Welsh politicians
Year of birth missing
People from Carmarthenshire
English MPs 1572–1583
English MPs 1593
Mayors of places in Wales
Members of the Parliament of England (pre-1707) for constituencies in Wales